Cockerham is a village in Lancashire, England.

Cockerham may also refer to:

Buildings
Cockerham Mill, a grist mill in North Carolina, United States
Cockerham Priory, a priory founded in Cockerham, England in 1207 or 1208
Cockerham Cross Halt railway station, a railway station founded in Cockerham, England in 1870
Cockerham Vicarage, a vicarage in Cockerham, England
St Michael's Church, Cockerham, a church southwest of Cockerham, England

People
Angela Cockerham, American Democratic Party politician
Ben Cockerham (born 1980), royalty processing company founder
C. Clark Cockerham (1921–1996), American geneticist
Fred Cockerham (1905–1980), American folk musician
Rob Cockerham, creator of Cockeyed.com

See also
Listed buildings in Cockerham
Cockerham bribery case, a case involving United States Army officers accused of accepting bribes